You, Me and the Windshield is the debut album of American country music singer Marcel. It was the only album he released for Mercury Nashville.

Content
The album includes the single "Country Rock Star", which peaked at number 46 on the Hot Country Songs charts. The album itself peaked at number 48 on Top Country Albums. "Nothin' to Lose" was later recorded by Josh Gracin on his self-titled debut album; his version was released as a single and peaked at number 1 on the same chart in 2005.

Critical reception
Jeffrey B. Remz of Country Standard Time gave a mostly-favorable review. His review praised Marcel's singing and the lyrics, saying that "Marcel also deserves credit for co-writing all 13 songs. No filler, all meat on them lyrically and musically, and he shows a sense of humor as well." although he was critical of the "bright and loud" production. Matt Bjorke of About.com gave a favorable review, saying that it was "diverse and different than what is currently played on country radio."

Track listing
 "Country Rock Star" (Marcel, Kevin Savigar) — 3:39
 "Tennessee" (Marcel, James T. Slater) — 4:16
 "Annie Devine" (Marcel, Slater, Kent Blazy) — 4:10
 "Missing You" (Marcel, Craig Wiseman) — 3:22
 "The Working Day" (Marcel, Savigar) — 3:55
 "I Won't Hold You Down" (Marcel, Slater) — 4:11
duet with Jessica Andrews
 "Take It" (Marcel, Tim Mathews) — 3:36
 "Nothin' to Lose" (Marcel, Savigar) — 3:27
 "You, Me and the Windshield" (Marcel, Billy Decker) — 3:02
 "Shadow" (Marcel, Kevin Fisher, Fred Wilhelm) — 3:21
 "Holding On to Letting Go" (Marcel, Slater) — 4:20
 "Perfect Situation" (Marcel, Bobby Terry) — 3:15
 "This Old Diesel" (Marcel, Matt Rollings, Kevin Greenberg) — 3:49

Personnel
Compiled from liner notes.

Musicians

Bekka Bramlett — tambourine on "Annie Devine", background vocals
Mike Brignardello — bass guitar
Pat Buchanan — electric guitar
Mark Casstevens — banjo
Stuart Duncan — fiddle, mandolin
Paul Franklin — steel guitar
Byron Gallimore — background vocals
Kenny Greenberg — electric guitar
Aubrey Haynie — fiddle, mandolin
Jim Hoke — harmonica
B. James Lowry — acoustic guitar
Frank J. Macek — drum loops
Marcel — vocals, harmonica
Brent Mason — electric guitar
Chris McHugh — drums
Steve Nathan — keyboards
Russ Pahl — steel guitar
Travis Parker — fiddle
Michael Rhodes — bass guitar
Matt Rollings — keyboards
James T. Slater — background vocals
Russell Terrell — background vocals
Tony "T-Bone" Wahrman — voice at the beginning of "Country Rock Star"
Biff Watson — acoustic guitar
Lonnie Wilson — drums
Glenn Worf — bass guitar
Jonathan Yudkin — cello on "I Won't Hold You Down"

Technical

 Jeff Balding — mixing (tracks 4, 7, 10, 11, 12)
 Byron Gallimore — production; mixing (tracks 6, 13)
 Julian King — recording
 Marcel — production
 Doug Sax — mastering
 Mike Shipley — mixing (tracks 1, 2, 3, 5, 8, 9)

Chart performance

References

2003 debut albums
Mercury Nashville albums
Marcel (singer) albums
Albums produced by Byron Gallimore